Morganella is a genus of puffball fungi in the family Agaricaceae. The genus name honors American botanist Andrew Price Morgan (1836–1907). The widely distributed genus is prevalent in tropical areas. A 2008 estimate placed nine species in Morganella, but several new species have since been described.

Species

See also
List of Agaricales genera
List of Agaricaceae genera

References

External links

Agaricaceae
Agaricales genera